You & Me is a British three-part romantic comedy-drama television series written by Jamie Davis. It premiered on 23 February 2023.

Cast
 Harry Lawtey as Ben
 Jessica Barden as Emma
 Sophia Brown as Jess
 Andi Osho as Pam
 Julie Hesmondhalgh as Linda
 Janie Dee as Hannah
 Dominic Mafham as Jeremy
 Lily Newmark as Joey
 Genesis Lynea as Dee
 Isabella Tyson as Poppy
 Lucas Tyson as Jack

Episodes

Production
In March 2021, ITV commissioned You & Me from actor Jamie Davis, marking Davis' screenwriting debut. The series would be executive produced by Dominic Treadwell-Collins of Happy Prince, Alexander Lamb, and Russell T Davies. Director Tom Vaughan would oversee the production.

It was announced in June 2022 that Harry Lawtey, Jessica Barden, and Sophia Brown would lead the series.

Principal photography took place on location in South East London in the summer of 2022.

Release
You & Me was presented at the 2022 MIPCOM in Cannes.

ITVX 23/02/23

References

External links
 

2023 British television series debuts
2020s British comedy-drama television series
2020s British romance television series
ITV comedy-dramas
Television shows set in London
Upcoming television series
Television series by ITV Studios
English-language television shows